Edwin Bardsley (1883 – 18 November 1916) was an English professional footballer who played in the Football League for Stockport County and Glossop as an outside left. His career was ended due to a broken leg suffered in a collision with William Foulke.

Personal life 
Bardsley served as a private in the Manchester Regiment during the First World War and was killed during the Battle of the Somme on 18 November 1916, while serving with the 2nd Battalion, Manchester Regiment. He is commemorated on the Thiepval Memorial.

Career statistics

References

1883 births
1916 deaths
People from Hadfield, Derbyshire
Footballers from Derbyshire
English footballers
Association football outside forwards
English Football League players
British Army personnel of World War I
Manchester Regiment soldiers
Military personnel from Derbyshire
Glossop North End A.F.C. players
British military personnel killed in the Battle of the Somme
Stockport County F.C. players